The 1957–58 Northern Rugby Football League season was the 63rd season of rugby league football.

Season summary
Hull F.C. won their fifth Championship when they beat Workington Town 20–3 in the play-off final. Oldham had finished the regular season as the league leaders.

The Challenge Cup winners were Wigan who beat Workington Town 13–9 in the final.

Oldham won the Lancashire League, and Halifax won the Yorkshire League. Oldham beat Wigan 13–8 to win the Lancashire County Cup, and Huddersfield beat York 15–8 to win the Yorkshire County Cup.

Championship

Play-offs

Challenge Cup

Wigan reached the final by beating Whitehaven 39–10 at home in the first round; Wakefield Trinity 11–5 away in the second round; Oldham 8–0 away in the quarter -finals and Rochdale Hornets 5–3 in the semi-final played at Station Road, Swinton. Captained by Eric Ashton, Wigan then beat Workington Town 13–9 in the Challenge Cup Final played at Wembley Stadium before a crowd of 66,109, with tries from Barton, McTigue and Sullivan and two goals from Cunliffe.

This was Wigan’s fifth Cup Final win in nine Final appearances. To date, this was Workington Town's last appearance in the Challenge Cup Final. Rees Thomas, Wigan's scrum half back won the Lance Todd Trophy for his man-of-the-match performance.

References

Sources
1957-58 Rugby Football League season at Wigan.rlfans.com
The Challenge Cup at The Rugby Football League website

1957 in English rugby league
1958 in English rugby league
Northern Rugby Football League seasons